The Clyman Subdivision or Clyman Sub is a  railway line owned and operated by the Union Pacific Railroad. It branches off of the Adams Subdivision to the north in Clyman Junction, Wisconsin, and continues south to Fort Atkinson, Wisconsin, where the line terminates. It is a segment of a former Chicago and North Western Railway line, which ran from Fond du Lac to Janesville. It is mainly used for locals that serve the many industrial spurs located along the line.

References 

Rail infrastructure in Wisconsin
Union Pacific Railroad lines